The Stone Boy may refer:
 Iya Hokshi, a part of the Dakota myth and folklore
 Stone Boy (superhero), a fictional superhero in the DC Universe
 The Stone Boy (film), a 1984 film directed by Christopher Cain
"The Stone Boy", a short story by the American author Gina Berriault
 The Stone Boy (TV series), a 1991 Indian television series on DD National